Sodo Airport  is an airport serving in Wolaita Sodo, a city in Wolaita Zone, Ethiopia. The airport is located 10 km (6 miles) to northern part of the city. Currently, the airport is not under operation and its reconstruction is started in 2022.

Accidents and incidents
In 20 November 1974: An Ethiopian Airlines Douglas C-47A, registration ET-AAR, that was due to fly a domestic passenger service to Beica, crashed on take-off. There were 24 occupants on board; both the pilot and the co-pilot perished in the accident. In 15 October 1978: Due to the loss of hydraulic pressure, an Ethiopian Airlines Douglas C-47B, registration ET-AGK, was diverted to the airport. The engines were cut out following landing, and the aircraft ended up in a drainage ditch. There were no fatalities, but the aircraft was written off.

See also

List of airports in Ethiopia

References

Airports in Ethiopia